The 1907 Canadian football season was the 16th season of organized play since the Canadian Rugby Union (CRU) was founded in 1892 and the 25th season since the creation of the Ontario Rugby Football Union (ORFU) and the Quebec Rugby Football Union (QRFU) in 1883. This year also marked the first for the Interprovincial Rugby Football Union, which is a predecessor of the modern day's CFL East Division. The season concluded with the Montreal Football Club defeating Peterboro in the 1907 Dominion Championship game.

Canadian Football News in 1907
In December 1906, The Gazette reported that a proposal originated from Ottawa for the Ontario Rugby Football Union (ORFU) and the Quebec Rugby Football Union (QRFU) to merge, which would allow for higher calibre of play and create rivalries. W. A. Hewitt and the Toronto Argonauts favoured the higher-level league, and sought for all players to have unquestioned amateur status. He helped organize the meeting which established the Inter-provincial Rugby Football Union (IRFU) in 1907.

The Interprovincial Rugby Football Union (also referred to as the Big Four) grew out of an amalgamation between the Hamilton Tigers and the Toronto Argonauts of the ORFU and the Ottawa Rough Riders and the Montreal Foot Ball Club of the QRFU on September 13. As a result of Ottawa and Montreal leaving, the QRFU withdrew from senior competition. The Ottawa entry was the result of the amalgamation of the Ottawa St. Pats and Rough Riders.

Montreal won the Big Four's first game, 17–8 over Toronto and later became the league's first championship team.

The CRU adopted the intercollegiate rule of one yard between opposing lines and stated that the lines could not move until the ball was put into play by the Scrimmage. Teams had to gain 10 yards in three downs; a Try was five points; a Goal from a Try was one point; a Goal from the Field was four points; a Free Kick was three points and a Penalty Kick was worth two points. The ORFU adopted the CRU rules.

Calgary City Rugby Football Club played its first game on October 31 and defeated the Strathcona Rugby Football Club 15–0 at Calgary. The Edmonton Rugby Foot-ball Club was formed on April 10 and adopted the uniform colors of black with yellow facings. Edmonton played its first game on November 9 and defeated the Calgary City Rugby Football Club 23–5 at the Edmonton Exhibition Grounds.

The Saskatchewan Rugby Football League was formed.

Regular season

Final regular season standings
Note: GP = Games Played, W = Wins, L = Losses, T = Ties, PF = Points For, PA = Points Against, Pts = Points
*Bold text means that they have clinched the playoffs

League champions

Playoffs

Alberta Rugby Football League Playoffs

Calgary advances to final

Edmonton wins the total-point series 36-10.

ORFU West Final

Peterboro advances to the ORFU Final.

ORFU Final

Peterboro advances to the Dominion Championship.

Dominion Championship

References

 
Canadian Football League seasons